Terminal (Terminal.app) is the terminal emulator included in the macOS operating system by Apple. Terminal originated in NeXTSTEP and OPENSTEP, the predecessor operating systems of macOS.

As a terminal emulator, the application provides text-based access to the operating system, in contrast to the mostly graphical nature of the user experience of macOS, by providing a command-line interface to the operating system when used in conjunction with a Unix shell, such as zsh (the default shell in macOS Catalina). The user can choose other shells available with macOS, such as the KornShell, tcsh, and bash.

The preferences dialog for Terminal.app in OS X 10.8 (Mountain Lion) and later offers choices for values of the TERM environment variable. Available options are ansi, dtterm, nsterm, rxvt, vt52, vt100, vt102, xterm, xterm-16color and xterm-256color, which differ from the OS X 10.5 (Leopard) choices by dropping the xterm-color and adding xterm-16color and xterm-256color. These settings do not alter the operation of Terminal, and the xterm settings do not match the behavior of xterm.

Terminal includes several features that specifically access macOS APIs and features. These include the ability to use the standard macOS Help search function to find manual pages and integration with Spotlight. Terminal was used by Apple as a showcase for macOS graphics APIs in early advertising of Mac OS X, offering a range of custom font and coloring options, including transparent backgrounds.

See also 
 List of terminal emulators

References 

Utilities for macOS
Terminal emulators